Dave Goulder (born 1 January 1939) is a British singer, guitarist, dry stone wall builder, mountain climber, railway fireman, humorist, and composer. He is best known for his song "January Man" and for his collections of railway songs which have received acclaim by critics and enthusiasts alike.

Family and personal life
Goulder is married to his wife Mary and lives in Rosehall in the Scottish Highlands.

Musical career

Early work
Dave Goulder left the railway in 1961 and began mountaineering while recording his first folk records in the late 1960s progressing in time to collections of railway songs.

Selected discography

Quotes

From Goulder

 "[The jaw harp] is particularly well suited to Scottish music; the drone effect being perfect for pipe marches in any time signature, in fact just about all bagpipe tunes will richly reward the player."

Notes

References
Goulder, Dave. How To Build and Repair Dry Stone Walls, A 60-minute video/DVD explaining the basic principles of dry stone walling. Filmed in Scotland and the Cotswolds, Dry Stone Walling Association, produced and filmed by Nigel Waterhouse.DSWA.

External links
 Dave Goulder Homepage
 Notes On Building A Cairn (pdf), by Dave Goulder for the DSWA, Dry Stone Walling Association of Great Britain.  Practical notes to help those embarking on a cairn-building project.
 

1939 births
Living people
British folk singers
British folk guitarists
British songwriters
Musicians from Derbyshire
People from Sutherland